The 2010–11 Montenegrin First Handball League was fifth season of the Montenegrin First League of Men's Handball, Montenegro's premier handball league.

Participants 

The league regularly consists of eight teams, but in the season 2010/11 there were seven participants, because the team of Budućnost Podgorica quit. In the second part of season, four best clubs participated in the TOP4 league for champion, and the last three played in relegation league.

The following seven clubs participated in the Montenegrin First League 2007/08.

First part 

During the first part of the season, all members played 12 games. Four teams - Mojkovac, Lovćen, Sutjeska and Rudar continued season in the TOP4 league for champion. Other teams were playing league for relegation.

Because of the rule to points from the U-21 championship adding to the all teams in the League, Rudar, which were placed at the 5th position, gone to the TOP4 league. So, fourth-placed Budvanska rivijera gone to the relegation league.

Table of the first part of the season:

TOP4 / relegation league 

At the final phase, RK Mojkovac won the first champions' title in the club history.
In the relegation league, at the bottom was RK Mornar.

TOP4 League

Relegation League

Summary 

 Promotion to the EHF Cup 2011/12: Mojkovac, Sutjeska Nikšić
 Promotion to the EHF Cup Winners' Cup 2011/12: Lovćen Cetinje
 Promotion to the SEHA League 2011/12: Lovćen Cetinje, Sutjeska Nikšić
 Relegation to the Second League 2008/09: Mornar Bar
 Promotion to the First league 2011/12: Cepelin Cetinje, Sedmerac Bar

Handball leagues in Montenegro
Hand
Hand
Monte